Saúl Suárez (born Colombia 1952) was a Colombian former football manager.

He became the first coach to qualify the Panama national football team for the CONCACAF Gold Cup in 1993.

References 

Panama national football team managers
Colombian football managers
Colombian expatriate football managers
Expatriate football managers in Panama
Colombian expatriate sportspeople in Panama
San Francisco F.C. managers
Living people
1952 births